Ivar Enger (born 1973), also known as "Zephyrous", is a Norwegian guitarist who played for the black metal band Darkthrone. He is credited as featuring on the band's first three albums; Soulside Journey, A Blaze in the Northern Sky and Under a Funeral Moon, as well as the Goatlord album; the rehearsal tapes of what was originally intended to be their second album (with later added vocals). He is said to have left due to delving into misanthropy, instead of generally leaving, as Darkthrone never had touring stress and he didn't leave prior because of the swift change from death metal to black metal, like other former member Dag Nilsen did.  The band maintains that Zephyrous went into a forest and never returned. However, in a 2006 interview with the German website Voices From The Dark Side, Nocturno Culto claims he still has contact with Zephyrous and would like him to join the band as a guest on a few songs at some point.

Very little information about Zephyrous is known, as Darkthrone have always maintained mystery about themselves, let alone past members.

In two interviews in 2001 and 2002 with Nocturno Culto, he stated that Zephyrous left Darkthrone partly because he felt "left out" by N.Culto and Fenriz, who were very close at the time, and partly because he was an alcoholic and had a black out while driving his car. "He woke up in the hospital with much strings attached to him". "He left Darkthrone in much anger".

Discography
Darkthrone
Soulside Journey (1991)
A Blaze in the Northern Sky (1992)
Under a Funeral Moon (1993)

References

Living people
Norwegian heavy metal guitarists
1973 births